Icius hamatus is a species of 'jumping spiders' belonging to the family Salticidae.

This species is mainly present in Portugal, Spain, France, Italy, Poland, Greece and Romania.

They prefer dry and hot habitats ("xerothermic") and can mainly be encountered on sunny bushes, shrubs and walls of houses (synanthropic organism), where they actively pursue their preys.

In males the basic color of the hairy body is rusty brown, with a white longitudinal stripe and a white line on the edge of the opistosoma. The prosoma is mainly rusty brown, while the pedipalps and the legs are whitish. In the females the basic color is mainly brownish or greyish, with darker markings. These spiders have eight eyes with very large anterior median eyes and smaller on each side. Their eyesight is excellent and very useful in their way of hunting.

References 

 Jerzy Proszynski 2005 - Icius hamatus

External links 
 
 Fauna Europaea
 Biolib
 Biodiversidad
 Icius hamatus
 tierdoku

Salticidae
Spiders described in 1846
Spiders of Europe
Articles containing video clips